The Maid of Orleans may refer to:

Joan of Arc
 "The Maid of Orleans" (poem), a 1730 unfinished poem by Voltaire
 The Maid of Orleans (play), an 1801 historical tragedy by Friedrich Schiller
 The Maid of Orleans (opera), an 1881 an opera by Pyotr Ilyich Tchaikovsky based on Schiller's play
 "Maid of Orleans (The Waltz Joan of Arc)", a 1982 single by Orchestral Manoeuvres in the Dark (OMD), sequel to their earlier single "Joan of Arc"
 オルレアンの少女 (Maid of Orleans), a song by Japanese visual kei band exist†trace.
 Maid of Orleans (horse)

See also
Joan of Arc (disambiguation)

de:Die Jungfrau von Orléans